Concord Area Transit (CAT) is the primary provider of public transportation in Concord, New Hampshire, United States. In the 1970s, there was discussion about the feasibility of bus service in Concord. Concord's City Council contracted with the Community Services Council to conduct a study. This study served as the framework for the system that was developed. Prior to 1989, Capital Transit had operated bus service in Concord and the YMCA had operated some senior service.

In 1989, the city of Concord went out to bid for public transit service.  Since high bids came in to operate the service, the city's mayor appointed a committee made up of supporters and detractors of the bus service. The outcome was to approach the Community Action Program Belknap-Merrimack Counties, Inc. (CAPBMCI) to provide the service.

CAPBMCI operated and continues to operate senior bus service in the region and, therefore, was in a position to step up to the plate. The agreement was that the city would provide match support (annual federal grants for transit require a 20% or 50% match depending on the type of funding) to purchase buses and three years of operating support as a pilot program.  A City of Concord Advisory Committee would work with CAPBMCI.

CAPBMCI began CAT and still operates it as one of its programs and transportation systems.  From CAT's inception, it included fixed-route service as well as weekday service for seniors and people with disabilities. The routes were from Concord Heights to Concord Hospital and from Penacook to the South End of Concord, along with service for people with disabilities and seniors. At this time, the first Orion buses were used on the routes. Trolley-shaped buses were rented and operated during the six-week holiday season for three years.  These trolleys were supported by the Chamber of Commerce, Concord Hospital and Steeplegate Mall.  CAMBMCI also assumed operation of senior service that had been operated by the YMCA.  In 1991, the City of Concord began to provide CAPBMCI with ongoing funding to support public transportation beyond the three-year pilot.

In 1999, the Americans with Disabilities Act (ADA) mandated specific regulations for bus service for people with disabilities. Since CAT already provided such service, it ensured that it conformed to the new ADA regulations. In 1999, CAT also operated the Penacook, Heights, Manchester Street and senior service routes. Manchester Street service was funded through a three-year Congestion Mitigation and Air Quality (CMAQ) grant.

By 2005, CAT had started a Crosstown bus service between Airport Road and Concord Hospital. The Crosstown bus developed into the Industrial Park route that operates between Industrial Park Drive and the hospital today.
  
CAT started year-round trolley service in 2008 when it received a three-year CMAQ grant.  The matching funds for this grant were generously donated by Delta Dental.

CAT currently provides fixed route transportation Monday-Friday from 6:00am to 6:30pm in Concord. CAT also provides demand-response transportation to seniors and people with disabilities.

Routes

Route 1 - Penacook
Route 2 - Heights
Route 3 - Crosstown
ADA Paratransit Service
Concord Senior Transit

External links
Concord Area Transit official website
City of Concord website

Bus transportation in New Hampshire
Transportation in Merrimack County, New Hampshire